June Chan (born June 6, 1956) is an American lesbian activist and biologist. The organizer and co-founder of the Asian Lesbians of the East Coast (ALOEC), Chan raised awareness for LGBT issues relating to the Asian-American community.

Biography 
Chan was born on June 6, 1956, in Lower Manhattan to parents who worked in New York City's Chinatown. Chan's mother was a refugee from China and the Japanese invasion of China. Chan's activism had its roots in her childhood, remembering tourists displaying racist attitudes to people in Chinatown. Chan attended the Bronx High School of Science and graduated in 1973. She went on to earn her bachelor's degree in biology at the City College of New York in 1977. Chan earned her master's degree in biology from the State University of Buffalo. After graduate school, she came out to her family, which was a mostly positive experience. Chan also works in research on neurobiology.

Chan and Katherine Hall met in 1983 and began working on projects together. They created a slide show of Asian lesbians in history and literature which were shown in the 1980s. Their Asian lesbian history slide show was considered "grassroots scholarship" by Polly Thistlethwaite. The slide show gave lesbians "a larger context for ourselves as Asian and Pacific Islander peoples, as people of color in the United States, and as lesbians."

Also in 1983, Chan and Hall formed the Asian Lesbians of the East Coast (ALOEC). The group was formed in response to the overly white and male LGBT community at the time and provided a place for support for lesbians. ALOEC conducted workshops and published newsletters. ALOEC took part in the 1989 LGBT march on Washington, D.C., demanding civil rights. During the process of organizing the march, Chan connected with other Asian-American lesbian groups. These groups and ALOEC formed the Asian Pacific Lesbian Network (later called the Asian Pacific Bi-Sexual Lesbian Network). In 1994, ALOEC participated in the 25th commemoration of the Stonewall riots.

References

Citations

Sources

Further reading

External links 
 Mariana combing June's Hair (picture)

Living people
1956 births
American LGBT rights activists
Writers from New York City
City College of New York alumni
University at Buffalo alumni
Activists from New York City